Nice Guys is a 1979 album by the Art Ensemble of Chicago, their first to appear on the ECM label.

Reception
The Allmusic review by Al Campbell awarded the album 4½ stars noting that "Nice Guys was the first Art Ensemble of Chicago album released after a five-year recording hiatus and the group's first for the ECM label. During those five years, the Art Ensemble toured Europe and continued to expand its compositional, improvisational, and theatrical jazz fundamentals, captured abundantly on Nice Guys... the album reveals how the AEC managed to turn individual compositions into a fully realized, surprisingly accessible, avant garde group collective". Down Beat critic Art Lange writes that Nice Guys, while not the Art Ensemble's best album, "is possibly their most representative, a variegated showcase illustrating much of what they do best."The Penguin Guide to Jazz awarded the album 3 stars out of 4 stating "'much of the music seems almost formulaic, the improvisation limited".

Track listing
 "Ja" (Lester Bowie) – 8:43  
 "Nice Guys" (Roscoe Mitchell) – 1:45  
 "Folkus" (Don Moye) – 11:03  
 "597–59" (Joseph Jarman) – 6:46  
 "CYP" (Mitchell) – 4:53  
 "Dreaming of the Master" (Jarman) – 11:40

Personnel
Lester Bowie: trumpet, celeste, bass drum
Malachi Favors Maghostut: bass, percussion instruments, melodica
Joseph Jarman: saxophones, clarinets, percussion instruments, vocal 
Roscoe Mitchell: saxophones, clarinets, flute, percussion instruments 
Don Moye: drums, percussion, vocal

References

1979 albums
ECM Records albums
Art Ensemble of Chicago albums
Albums produced by Manfred Eicher